Strigino is a rural locality (a selo) in Kovarditskoye Rural Settlement, Muromsky District, Vladimir Oblast, Russia. The population was 346 as of 2010. There are 6 streets.

Geography 
Strigino is located 15 km west of Murom (the district's administrative centre) by road. Gribkovo is the nearest rural locality.

References 

Rural localities in Muromsky District
Muromsky Uyezd